Ruy Special Town ( – Shahrak Takheṣṣī-ye Rūy) is a village in Mojezat Rural District, in the Central District of Zanjan County, Zanjan Province, Iran. At the 2006 census, its population was 31, in 6 families.

References 

Populated places in Zanjan County